Elchin Shikhly (born October 4, 1957) is the creator and editor-in-chief of  "Ayna"-"Zerkalo" newspapers since 2001. He is a member of the Azerbaijani Writers' Union since 1989, and is the chairman of the Azerbaijani Journalists' Union since 2006.

Life 
Shikhly was born on October 4, 1957 in Baku. He graduated School №190 in 1974. Elchin received his education at Azerbaijan Pedagogical Foreign Languages Institute English faculty between 1974 and 1979. He has worked as an inspector of the department of information and advertisement at Foreign Tourist Office under the Council of Ministers of Azerbaijan SSR.

On October, 1979 Elchin Shikhly joined the Soviet Army and during that time he worked as a translator.  Elchin Shikhly is a writer and is Ismayil Shikhly's son. He is married and has two children.

Activity 
 On July–August, 1981 – "İnturist" USC Baku, translator
 In 1981–1986 – Azerbaijan Society of Friendship and Cultural Relations with Foreign Countries, reviewer
 In 1986–1988 – Ministry of Education of Azerbaijan SSR, scribe
 In 1988–1989 – The Board of Directors of the section named after Lenin Azerbaijan Republic Soviet Children's Fund, chief reviewer
 In 1989–1990 – "The Communist of Azerbaijan" magazine
 In 1990–1998 – "Ayna"-"Zerkalo" newspapers, deputy editor-in-chief
 In 1998–1999 – "Al-ver" newspaper, editor-in-chief
 In 1999–2001– "Ayna Mətbu Evi" company, president

References

1957 births
Azerbaijani journalists
Azerbaijani writers
Azerbaijani translators
Living people
Shikhlinskis